The Electronic Sports World Convention (ESWC) (formerly known as Electronic Sports World Cup) is an international professional gaming championship. Every year, winners of national qualifier events around the world earn the right to represent their country in the ESWC Finals. The event has been praised for its organisation and ability to put on a good show for spectators.

The ESWC was originally created by a French company, Ligarena, that had previously hosted smaller Local Area Network (LAN) events in France under the name of LAN Arena. In 2003, Ligarena decided to do something on a larger scale and the ESWC was born. In 2005, Ligarena became Games-Services.

In 2009, ESWC was bought by another French company, Games-Solution, which became the owner of the brand.

In 2012, Oxent, an agency specialising in electronic sports, acquired the ESWC.

The grand finals and masters of ESWC have had a total prize purse of €1,721,000 between 2003 and 2010.

Overview
The first Electronic Sports World Cup was held in 2003 with a total of 358 participants from 37 countries and a prize purse of €150,000. To participate in the tournament, competitors had to place in their country's national qualifier. By 2006, the event had grown to 547 qualified participants from 53 countries and had a prize purse of $400,000 US.  The event also featured the first competition with a game specifically made for it: TrackMania Nations.

2003
The 2003 ESWC saw around 150,000 players narrowed down to just 358 players, from 37 different countries, who attended the finals at the Futuroscope near Poitiers in France. The total prize fund for the event was €156,000.

 SK Gaming representing Sweden in the Counter-Strike competition

2004
The 2004 finals were once again held at the Futuroscope. Roughly 400 finalists, from 41 countries, attended to compete for a €210,000 prize purse.

2005
In 2005, the venue was moved to a larger facility: The Carrousel du Louvre in Paris. The total prize payout was again raised - this time to €300,000.

*SK-Gaming's, secondary, Danish squad

2006

The 2006 event took place at the Palais omnisports de Paris-Bercy and the total prize payout was approximately €300,000.

 SK Gaming representing USA in Counter-Strike female

2007
The 2007 ESWC took place at the Paris expo Porte de Versailles, Paris, from July 5 to July 8. There was a complete expo for this event, called "Mondial du Gaming" (World of Gaming).

750 finalists, from 51 countries, competed for a prize purse of $180,000 US.

2008
Leaving France for the first time, the 2008 Electronic Sports World Cup took place in San Jose, California, USA, from August 25 to August 27 during the bigger "NVISION 08" event. The disciplines announced were: Counter-Strike (open and female), Warcraft III: The Frozen Throne, Trackmania Nations Forever, Defense of the Ancients and, Quake 3. Pro Evolution Soccer was not included because the global Konami authority had not given its support to the competition. The prize purse was approximately $200,000 US.

Masters of Paris
In place of the ESWC, the "Masters of Paris" was held from July 4 to July 6, during the "Mondial du Gaming", taking place at the Palais omnisports de Paris-Bercy. The same disciplines took place during this Masters and offered additional qualifying slots for ESWC Grand Final in San Jose. All winners won a slot to participate in the ESWC Grand Final, and hotel accommodation in San Jose, free of charge.

Masters of Athens
"Masters of Athens" was held from October 17 to October 18, 2008, during the Athens Digital Week. Disciplines featured were Quake III and Warcraft III: The Frozen Throne. The tournament had a $30.000 prize purse, and the champion qualified for ESWC 2009.

2009

Masters of Cheonan
Venue: Cheonan, South Korea
Prize: €54,000 
Date: 2–6 May 2009

2010

The 2010 "Electronic Sports World Cup", which took place at Disneyland Paris, featured a €213,500 prize purse. Games Solution (or DIP-Organisation) took over the ESWC in 2010.

2011
This event marked the transitional replacement and additions of several cornerstone tournament titles. This included the replacement of Warcraft III: The Frozen Throne with StarCraft II: Wings of Liberty, as well as the replacement of Defense of the Ancients with Dota 2. Additionally, this event marked the first and only year in which Counter-Strike: Source was present. It was also the last year that would include Counter-Strike 1.6, which was the main attraction of the tournament for many years, and the last remaining game that had been featured in the inaugural ESWC event.
 Date : From October 20 to October 25, 2011
 Venue : Paris Games Week, Porte de Versailles, Paris, France
 Production : Photos | Videos

2012
 Date : From October 30 to November 4, 2012
 Venue : Paris Games Week, Porte de Versailles, Paris, France
 Official disciplines : Counter-Strike: Global Offensive on PC (5v5), Shootmania Storm on PC (3v3), Call of Duty Black Ops 2 on Xbox 360 (4v4), Dota 2 on PC (5v5), FIFA 14 on Xbox 360 (1v1), Trackmania² Stadium on PC (1v4)
 Production : Photos | Videos

2013
 Date : From October 30 to November 3, 2013
 Venue : Paris Games Week, Porte de Versailles, Paris, France
 Official disciplines : Counter-Strike: Global Offensive on PC (5v5), ShootMania Storm on PC (3v3), Call of Duty: Black Ops 2  on Xbox 360 (4v4), Dota 2 on PC (5v5), FIFA 14 on Xbox 360 (1v1),  Trackmania Stadium on PC (1v4)
 Production : Archives | Photos | Videos

2014
 Date : From October 29 to November 2, 2014
 Venue : Paris Games Week, Porte de Versailles, Paris, France
 Official disciplines : Counter-Strike: Global Offensive on PC (5v5), Call of Duty:Ghosts on Xbox One (4v4), Just Dance (video game) on Xbox One (1v1), FIFA 15 on Xbox One (1v1), Trackmania² Stadium on PC (1v4), ShootMania Storm on PC (3v3)
 Production : Archives | Photos | Videos

2015

ESWC 2015 COD
 Date : May 2–3, 2015
 Venue : Zenith-Paris, Paris, France
 Official disciplines : Call of Duty: Advanced Warfare on Xbox One (4v4)

ESWC 2015 CSGO
 Date : From July 9 to July 12, 2015
 Venue : Mondial des Jeux Loto Québec, Montreal, Quebec
 Official disciplines : Counter-Strike: Global Offensive on PC (5v5)

2015 PGW
 Date : From October 28 to November 1, 2015
 Venue : Paris Games Week, Porte de Versailles, Paris, France
 Official disciplines : Counter Strike: Global Offensive on PC (5vs5), FIFA 16, League of legends on PC (5vs5), Just Dance, Trackmania² Stadium on PC (1v4), ShootMania Storm on PC (3v3)

2016
 1st  $20,000  2,500  OpTic Gaming
 2nd  $10,000  1,500  Splyce  
 3rd  $6,000  1,100  Rise Nation 
 4th  $4,000  900  Millenium

Medal Tally
Throughout the ESWC finals the medal tally is as follows (as of ESWC 2014):

External links
Electronic Sports World Cup

Official Media Partners 
 Cadred.org
 ESEA News

References

World championships in esports
StarCraft competitions
Esports tournaments
2003 establishments in France